Hardball is an Australian children's television series set to screen on ABC Me. The series is produced by Northern Pictures with Screen Australia in association with Create NSW and the Australian Children's Television Foundation (ACTF). It was released to stream on the ABC Me app on April 1, 2019, and aired on April 22, 2019 the second season came out in 2021. The series is filmed at La Perouse Public School in La Perouse, NSW, Australia

Plot
Mikey moves to Western Sydney, where he meets Jerry and Salwa, who want to help him win at handball. The elected school principal is Ms. Crapper and Tiffany's dads are Steele and Stone.

Cast
 Semisi Cheekam as Mikey
 Reannah Hamdan as Salwa
 Holly Simon as Prisha
 Logan Reberger as Jerry
 Erin Choy as Tiffany
 Helen Dallimore as Ms. Crapper
 Daya Sao-Mafiti as Daddy
 Maria Walker as Auntie
Sam Everinghamas Viktor
 Ella Holowell as Ivanka
 Jack Scott as Kevin
Nicholas Cradock as Lance
 Tilly Jefferson as Lily
 Taylan Gogan as Bao
 Mahdi Mourad as Mustafa

Guests
 Guy Edmonds as Stone 
 Matt Zeremes as Steele
 Wendy Strehlow as Tuck Shop Lady/Food Truck Lady/Chip Shop Lady
 Hugo Johnstone-Burt as Connor McCaan
 Sam Alhaje as Chicken Billy
 Jay Laga'aia as Mr Butte
 Haiha Le as Miss Bahm
 Andrew Ryan as Garry Garrison
 Madeleine Jones as Reporter

Episodes

Season 1 (2019)

Season 2 
The second season of Hardball screened from 25 June 2021.

References

Australian Broadcasting Corporation original programming
2019 Australian television series debuts
2010s Australian television series
Australian children's television series
Australian comedy television series
Australian comedy-drama television series
English-language television shows
Television shows set in Australia